Gandhidham Junction railway station (code:- GIMB), located in Gandhidham, Gujarat, India, serves the people residing in Gandhidham and Kandla areas.

History
Before the formation of Gandhidham BG railway station by Indian Railways, the Cutch State Railway operated 2 ft 6inch narrow-gauge railway line.  A train used to run towards Anjar from the port of Tuna. The railway was financed by the Maharao Khengarji Bawa of Cutch. This started way back in 1905.

The railway line was extended from Anjar to Bhuj in 1908.

The rail line from Varshamedi to Bhachau was opened in 1910. The 15 mile rail line from Anjar to Kandla was started in 1930. Another line was laid from Kandla to Disa in North Gujarat in 1950 by the Indian Railways.

Railway Reorganization
Cutch State Railway was merged with the Western Railway on 5 November 1951.  The foundation stone of Gandhidham railway station was laid on 7 April 1955. After the gauge conversion of Viramgam–Wankaner–Gandhidham section in the earlier 1980s. the first train from Gandhidham to Mumbai was introduced on 2 October 1984. After the gauge conversion of Gandhidham–Bhuj section in 2001.
some of the trains were extended to Bhuj.
Gauge conversion of Palanpur–Gandhidham was completed on 24 March 2006. New services were introduced via Palanpur.

Diesel loco shed
Newly form Gandhidham Diesel loco has code of GIMB.

Achievements
In July 2016, Gandhidham was pronounced the second cleanest railway station in India according to a passenger feedback survey conducted by the Indian Railways as part of the Swacch Bharat Abhiyaan.

References

External links

Railway stations in Kutch district
Ahmedabad railway division
Railway junction stations in Gujarat
Transport in Gandhidham
Gandhidham